Us3 is a British jazz rap group founded in London in 1992. Their name was inspired by a Horace Parlan album, titled Us Three, produced by Alfred Lion, the founder of Blue Note Records. On their debut album, Hand on the Torch, Us3 exclusively used samples from the Blue Note catalogue, all originally produced by Lion.

History
Us3 was created by London-based producer Geoff Wilkinson. Formed in 1992 alongside production partner Mel Simpson, Us3 had two previous incarnations. The first, a limited edition white label 12" release in 1990 called "Where Will We Be in the 21st Century". The release garnered the attention of independent label Ninja Tune, resulting in NW1's 1991 12" "The Band Played The Boogie", featuring UK rapper Born 2 B. It sampled a dancefloor tune of the burgeoning jazz dance scene, Grant Green's "Sookie Sookie", originally released on Blue Note Records.

London's Kiss FM added "The Band Played The Boogie" to its playlist and Wilkinson then received a call summoning him to EMI Records's offices in London. Wilkinson avoided a lawsuit and was granted rights to the archives of Blue Note Records. One of the resulting demos, recorded in March 1992, was "Cantaloop (Flip Fantasia)", featuring UK trumpeter Gerard Presencer. It sampled Herbie Hancock's "Cantaloupe Island". Two years later, it entered the US top ten and was included on Hand on the Torch, the first Blue Note album to achieve platinum status (1,000,000 sales) in the US.

More touring followed, but personnel changes within Blue Note's owner, Capitol Records, allowed Wilkinson to leave and sign to Sony, working with the A&R executive that initially signed him in 1992.. Blue Note samples were not included and two new vocalists joined the group: rapper Michelob, and singer Alison Crockett. However, before the album was complete, a major personnel change at Sony left Us3 in limbo..

Discography

Albums

Singles

References

Other sources
Radio interview with Us3 founder Geoff Wilkinson on Kiss FM February 1992 Us3 Founder Geoff Wilkinson and Born 2 B, Kiss FM London 1992 - Play on N1M
Ninja Tune - Two decades of mixes and mash-ups

External links
 
The Us3 youtube channel
The official Us3 myspace page
Comprehensive 2009 interview with Geoff Wilkinson
"Jazz and Hip-Hop: Can They Really Mix?" by Jared Pauley, (Jazz.com)

English hip hop groups
Alternative hip hop groups
Musical groups from London
Musical groups established in 1992
Blue Note Records artists
EmArcy Records artists